Alejandro Falla and Alejandro González were the defending champions, but Falla decided not to participate this year.
As a result, González partnered with Rodrigo Guidolin. They were eliminated by Marcos Daniel and João Souza already in the first round.Franco Ferreiro and André Sá defeated Gero Kretschmer and Alex Satschko 7–6(6), 6–4 in the final.

Seeds

Draw

Draw

References
 Doubles Draw

Copa Petrobras Bogota - Doubles
Copa Petrobras Bogotá